Aaliyah Brown (born January 6, 1995) is an American sprinter. She competed in the women's 4 × 100 metres relay at the 2017 World Championships in Athletics.

References

External links
 
 
 

1995 births
Living people
American female sprinters
World Athletics Championships athletes for the United States
World Athletics Championships medalists
Place of birth missing (living people)
World Athletics Championships winners
21st-century American women